Mahamat Ahmat Labbo (born 21 July 1988) is a Chadian professional footballer who plays as striker for French club FC Portugais de Cholet.

International career
Labbo plays for national team of Chad. He debuted for in 2011, in a match against Botswana in N'Djamena. As of April 2022, he has earned 17 caps and scored 4 goals.

International goals
Scores and results list Chad's goal tally first.

References

External links
 
 

1988 births
Living people
Chadian Muslims
Chadian footballers
People from N'Djamena
Chad international footballers
Association football forwards
Association football midfielders
Stade Lavallois players
ES Bonchamp players
US Changé players
R. Olympic Charleroi Châtelet Farciennes players
Les Herbiers VF players
Championnat National 3 players
Championnat National players
Division d'Honneur players
Chadian expatriate footballers
Expatriate footballers in France
Expatriate footballers in Belgium
Chadian expatriate sportspeople in France
Chadian expatriate sportspeople in Belgium